Elsie Gunborg Johansson (born 1 May 1931 in Uppland, Sweden) is a Swedish writer. She is sometimes considered a proletarian writer.

Biography 
Elsie Johansson was born in Vendel as the fifth child of a statare. Her father would later find work as a lumberjack and construction worker. The Johansson family lived under sparse circumstances in a simple cabin, which would later serve as inspiration for similar housings found in Johansson's novels. Owing to the persuasion of a female teacher, Johansson was allowed to attend realskola in Uppsala, from which she graduated in 1948; upon graduation, she found employment as a postal worker. She married at the age of 18, and had a child at 19.

Johansson would work at the post office for another 30 years, before making her literary debut with the poetry collection Brorsan hade en vevgrammofon, at the age of 48. Her first novel, Kvinnan som mötte en hund, followed in 1984. In addition to her poems and novels intended for adult readers, she has written a number of books for children and adolescents.

Her breakthrough as a writer came with the Nancy trilogy (Glasfåglarna, Mosippan and Nancy), which earned her several awards, amongst others the Aniara Prize. Johansson also received the Litteris et Artibus award.

Bibliography 
 1979 – Brorsan hade en vevgrammofon ("Brotha Had a Wind-up Grammophone")
 1981 – Potatisballader ("Potato Ballads")
 1984 – Kvinnan som mötte en hund ("The Woman Who Met a Dog")
 1985 – Det bruna kuvertet ("The Brown Envelope")
 1987 – Gå i mitt gräs ("Walk in My Grass")
 1987 – Mormorsmysteriet ("The Grandmother Mystery") (children's novel)
 1989 – Tigerfrukost ("Tiger Breakfast")
 1989 – Vardagstankar ("Everyday Thoughts")
 1990 – Oss skrämmer dom inte ("They Don't Frighten Us")
 1991 – Kattbreven ("The Cat Letters") (children's novel)
 1992 – Ordens makt och maktens ord ("The Power of Words and the Words of Power")
 1995 – Lindansaren ("The Tightrope Walker")
 1995 – Guldmannen ("The Gold Man")
 1996 – Glasfåglarna ("The Glass Birds")
 1998 – Dikter 1979–1989 ("Poems 1979-1989")
 1998 – Mosippan ("The Spring Pasque Flower")
 2001 – Nancy
 2003 – Berättelsen om Nancy ("The Story of Nancy") (volume collecting Glasfåglarna, Mosippan and Nancy)
 2004 – Näckrosträdet ("The Water Lily Tree")
 2008 – Sin ensamma kropp ("Her Lonely Body")
 2011 – Då nu är jag ("When Now Is Me")
 2016 - Riktiga Elsie ("The Real Elsie")

Awards and honors 
 Lundequistska bokhandelns litteraturpris 1996
 Fackföreningsrörelsens Ivar Lo-pris 1997
 BMF-plaketten 1998 (for Mosippan)
 Moa Award 1999
 Stig Dagerman Prize 2001
 Siripriset 2001
 SKTF:s pris-writer of the year 2001
 Hedenvind-plaketten 2002
 Aniara-priset 2002
 The Litteris et Artibus medal 2002
 Årets väckarklocka 2004
 ABF:s litteraturpris 2006
 Jan Fridegårdspriset 2008
 Sveriges Radio's Romanpris 2009 (for Sin ensamma kropp)

References 

Swedish-language writers
Swedish children's writers
Swedish women children's writers
Sommar (radio program) hosts
1931 births
Litteris et Artibus recipients
Living people
Writers from Uppland
People from Tierp Municipality
Moa Award recipients